Hermann Koch may refer to:

 Hermann Georg Willibald Koch (1882–1957), an Estonian politician
 Hermann Koch (politician) (1899-1984), German politician
 Hermann Koch (painter) (1856–1939), German painter

See also
 Herman Koch (born 1953, Dutch writer)